Thornbury High School is a government-funded co-educational secondary day school, located in , Victoria, Australia. It is situated at the eastern end of the City of Darebin, on Dundas Street & Collins Street, Thornbury.

The school caters to a cohort of diverse students, and has a long history of celebrating multiculturalism and cultural inclusion through its engagement with initiatives such as Harmony Day, and the Wirrapanda Foundation. The school is also a strong promoter of the performing arts through its involvement with the Malthouse Theatre's "Suitcase Series", student radio station SYN FM (originating at the school as 3TD FM), and Class TV, a student-produced television program airing on Channel 31, winner of two Antenna Awards for Best Youth Program.

Notable alumni 

Billy Celeski, soccer player
Andrew Lovett, Australian rules footballer who played for Essendon Football Club

References

External links 
 

Public high schools in Melbourne
1962 establishments in Australia
Educational institutions established in 1962
Buildings and structures in the City of Darebin